Willie Smith (born August 6, 1964) is a former American football tight end who played one season with the Miami Dolphins of the National Football League (NFL). He was drafted by the Cleveland Browns in the tenth round of the 1986 NFL Draft. Smith played college football at the University of Miami and attended Englewood High School in Jacksonville, Florida. He was a consensus All-American in 1985.

College career
Smith accumulated 117 catches, 1,544 receiving yards and 6 touchdowns in his career at the University of Miami. He was a Consensus All-American in 1985.

Professional career
Smith was drafted by the Cleveland Browns of the NFL with the 265th pick in the 1986 NFL Draft. He was released by the Browns in July 1986.

References

External links
Just Sports Stats
College stats

Living people
1964 births
American football tight ends
Miami Hurricanes football players
Cleveland Browns players
Miami Dolphins players
All-American college football players
Players of American football from Jacksonville, Florida
Engelwood High School (Florida) alumni
National Football League replacement players